Palazzolo dello Stella is a comune (municipality) in the Province of Udine in the Italian region Friuli-Venezia Giulia, located about  northwest of Trieste and about  southwest of Udine.

Twin towns
Palazzolo dello Stella is town twinned with:

  Gratkorn, Austria

References

External links
 Official website

Cities and towns in Friuli-Venezia Giulia